Dunleith is a suburb of Wilmington, in New Castle County, Delaware, United States. It was built in the early 1950s, and was the first housing development marketed for African-Americans in Delaware. In 1990, the population was 2,600.

Geography 

Dunleith is located at  (39.708724, -75.555479). It is two miles (3.2 km) south of Wilmington and the Delaware Memorial Bridge is two miles (3.2 km) SE.

History 

The community was named after the Rogers and Du Pont family's estate, "Dunleith Mansion". Many World War II veterans, blue-collar workers, and  teachers became homeowners for the first time. The streets were named after prominent African-Americans such as Jackie Robinson, Ralph Bunche and George Washington Carver. Subsequently, two churches were built; Coleman Memorial Methodist Church on Anderson Drive and Community Presbyterian Church on Rogers Road. The Dunleith Community School was founded in 1956.

Gallery

References

Sources
 WDEL 1150AM - Historical marker to be unveiled in Dunleith
 Maurice Howard/ Freelance Photographer - Around Delaware
 "Preservationists work to recognize subdivisions built for blacks", International Herald Tribune, Associated Press (February 13, 2008).

African-American history of Delaware
Unincorporated communities in New Castle County, Delaware
Unincorporated communities in Delaware